Joy Charity Enriquez is an American singer and actress who has appeared on the television series 7th Heaven and also starred in films such as Chasing Papi and Lady and the Tramp II: Scamp's Adventure (voice). Enriquez was also a background singer on the single "When You Believe", a duet by Whitney Houston and Mariah Carey.

Biography
Enriquez was born in Whittier, California, United States.  At age sixteen she participated in Star Search and won eleven performances. After Star Search, her mother began sending out videotapes of her performances, hoping to land a record deal. Enriquez got a solo deal with LaFace Records and released her debut album Joy Enriquez, in 2001. The album and its first single, "Tell Me How You Feel" had some success internationally, providing the opportunity for Enriquez to make promotional visits to Japan, Australia, New Zealand, Germany, Singapore, and Korea. In the US, Enriquez's album was released one week after the 9/11 attacks. Her older sister, Tiffany Enriquez, who is still her manager as well as Epic Records recording artist Tiffany Dunn, has given voice lessons to American Idol finalist Allison Iraheta. 

On April 4, 2004, Enriquez married record producer Rodney Jerkins, who had worked on her debut album. Their first child is Rodney David Jerkins Jr. Their second child is daughter Heavenly Joy Jerkins. Their third child is Hannah Joy Jerkins, followed by their fourth, Royal David Jerkins. 

After almost completing a follow-up album in the same Pop/R&B vein as her debut, which would have featured the leaked track "It's So Funny", a collaboration with Mase, Joy had a change of heart about the musical direction she wished to pursue. She decided that her next release should be an inspirational/contemporary Christian music record. The ensuing album, Atmosphere of Heaven, was released on March 7, 2006 on the independent label JoyfulChild, which was formed by Jerkins and Enriquez.

In 2010, she wrote the track "Boom Chika Boom" for the Our Family Wedding soundtrack, and performed/wrote the song "Beatz Be Rockin'" for the Nickelodeon iCarly series.

She contributed songs to the Lifetime series Dance Moms in 2012 with the track "Light My Fire" getting a separate digital single release.

In 2013, her reality series House of Joy premiered on the NUVOtv network on July 18, 2013. After each episode, a new digital single would be released on digital services. These eight songs, along with the theme song, were released on an EP, House of Joy, on September 10, 2013.

In 2015, she released two digital singles: "Hallelujah" featuring Lindsey Stirling and "Shine" featuring her daughter Heavenly Joy. Her third studio album The Call was released on January 15, 2016.

Discography

Studio albums

EPs

Singles

Notes
 "—" denotes releases that did not chart or were not released in that country.
 A^ Joy Enriquez was re-released in Japan and United States in a different album cover and track listing.
 B^ Song was also included on Anna and the King movie soundtrack as a theme song.

Soundtracks

Personal life
Enriquez has been married to producer Rodney Jerkins since April 4, 2004, and they have four children: Rodney David Jerkins Jr., Heavenly Joy Jerkins, Hannah Joy Jerkins, and Royal David Jerkins. Enriquez married Jerkins at the Ritz Carlton in Laguna Niguel, California

In 2015, Enriquez's daughter, Heavenly Joy, was a contestant on season 10 of America's Got Talent.

Filmography

Film

Television

References

External links

Living people
American musicians of Mexican descent
Musicians from Whittier, California
American television actresses
Actors from Whittier, California
American women pop singers
American Latin pop singers
Singers from California
American soap opera actresses
American voice actresses
21st-century American actresses
20th-century American actresses
American film actresses
Participants in American reality television series
Television personalities from California
20th-century American women singers
21st-century American women singers
Hispanic and Latino American musicians
20th-century American singers
21st-century American singers
American actresses of Mexican descent
Year of birth missing (living people)